Bela cycladensis is a species of sea snail, a marine gastropod mollusc in the family Mangeliidae.

Description
The length of the shell attains 8 mm.

Distribution
This species is found in the Mediterranean Sea off the Cyclades.

References

 Catlow, Agnes, and Lovrll Reeve. "The conchologist’s nomenclator." Reeve Brothers, London.[1] 8 (1845): 1-326.
 Gofas, S.; Le Renard, J.; Bouchet, P. (2001). Mollusca, in: Costello, M.J. et al. (Ed.) (2001). European register of marine species: a check-list of the marine species in Europe and a bibliography of guides to their identification. Collection Patrimoines Naturels, 50: pp. 180–213

External links
 Reeve L.A. (1843-1846). Monograph of the genus Pleurotoma. In: Conchologia Iconica, vol. 1, pl. 1-40 and unpaginated text. L. Reeve & Co., London.
 
  Tucker, J.K. 2004 Catalog of recent and fossil turrids (Mollusca: Gastropoda). Zootaxa 682:1-1295.

cycladensis
Gastropods described in 1845